Tjokorda Raka Sukawati (May 3, 1931 – November 11, 2014) was an Indonesian engineer who invented Sosrobahu. He was born and died in Ubud, Bali, and in 2019 was conferred honorary T. Washington Fellow in science posthumously.

References

External links
  Tjokorda Raka Sukawati profile at kamusilmiah.com
  Tjokorda Raka Sukawati profile at jakarta.go.id

1931 births
2014 deaths
Indonesian civil engineers
20th-century Indonesian engineers
Indonesian Hindus